Shannon Express is a male barbershop chorus based in Potton, Bedfordshire, England. The chorus formed in 1978 and has twice won the British Association of Barbershop Singers (BABS) gold medal, in 1995 and 1998. The chorus meets every Thursday from 7.30pm to 10.15pm at Potton Lower School.

The group is named after the original engine that ran on the railway from Potton to Sandy and whose construction was begun by Sir William Peel and opened in 1857.

A sister chorus is the Phoenix Ladies Showcase Chorus.

More recent events and accomplishments can be found on their official website.

Discography
 Shannon Expressions

References

External links
 Shannon Express website

Barbershop music
A cappella musical groups
Culture in Bedfordshire
People from Potton